Reik is a Mexican pop rock band from Mexicali, Baja California, formed in 2003 by Jesús Alberto Navarro Rosas (lead vocals), Julio Ramírez Eguía (guitar, background vocals), and Gilberto Marín Espinoza (guitar). The group's first five albums have been classified as Latin pop, but the group has since transitioned to a more urban-influenced sound since 2015. Reik has won a Latin Billboard Music Award, four Los Premios MTV Latinoamérica awards, and a Latin Grammy.

Formed in 2003, the group released its self-titled debut album in 2005 which featured the singles "Yo Quisiera" and "Qué Vida La Mía". Reik's second studio album, Secuencia, was released on 12 December 2006, anchored by the single, "Invierno". On 30 September 2008, Reik released its third studio album Un Día Más, for which the band won the Latin Grammy Award for Best Pop Album by a Duo or Group with Vocals in 2009. The band's following releases Peligro (2011) and Des/Amor (2015) featured a more electronic sound.

Feeling frustrated with the perceived stagnation of Latin pop after the release of Des/Amor, the band evolved its sound and began collaborating with reggaeton artists. The band has since released popular singles "Ya Me Enteré" with Nicky Jam, "Me niego" with Ozuna, and "Amigos Con Derechos" with Maluma. These singles have charted on numerous Billboard charts and have renewed the band's popularity. The group also collaborated with Korean pop group Super Junior on the song “One More Time (Otra Vez)”.

Members

Jesús Alberto Navarro
Jesús Alberto Navarro Rosas is the vocalist. He was born on 9 July 1986, in the city of Mexicali, Baja California, Mexico. He started singing at the age of six when he joined a choir at his local church. Growing up his musical influences were very diverse. He was inspired by John Mayer, Justin Timberlake, Robbie Williams, Thalía, and Mónica Naranjo.

Julio Ramírez Eguía
Julio Ramírez Eguía is the guitarist. He was born on 21 December 1987, in the city of Mexicali. He has been playing the guitar since he was twelve years old. Growing up, he was influenced by Further Seems Forever. At nine years old, he was a black belt national champion in karate. When he was about fourteen or fifteen years old, he had his own soccer team and were champions as well.

Gilberto Marín Espinoza
Gilberto Bibi Marín Espinoza is the group's electric guitarist. He was born on 26 January 1983, in the city of Mexicali. He was the last one to join the band. In 2002, he enrolled in the Autonomous University of Baja California in Mexicali but dropped out to focus on his music career. He is married to Kalinda Kano and has two children Jazz and Emil.

History

2005-2015: Formation and early albums
In 2003, Abelardo Vázquez ended their then-nascent musical project, tentatively called "Reik". Vázquez invited Jesús Navarro and Julio Ramirez to record their first demos, which were released through the Mexican underground club scene. Two of the most successful demos — "Levemente" and "Ahora Sin Ti" — brought more widespread coverage across Mexico. In early 2004, Reik invited Gilberto to join the band. On 24 May 2005, Reik released their self-titled debut album, produced by Kiko Cibrian. The group's name actually means "rake" (as in raking the guitar's strings), but the band wanted their non-English speaking Mexican listeners to pronounce it correctly, hence, Reik. The first single "Yo Quisiera" got heavy rotation on Mexican pop radio stations and soon went to number one. Their second single "Qué Vida La Mía" also topped the Mexican charts as did their third single "Noviembre Sin Ti". Their fourth single, "Niña", failed to match the success of their previous singles, charting only at number 33.

Reik's debut album went gold in Mexico on 6 May 2005 after selling 50,000 copies. In June 2005, Reik traveled to the United States to promote their album and its first single. They had a promotional mini-tour that visited Miami, McAllen, San Antonio, Houston, Dallas, San Juan (Puerto Rico), and New York. The album was formally released in the United States in May of that same year. To date, the album has sold 40,000 copies in the United States alone. By May, the album was certified platinum in Mexico for selling 120,000 copies. Holi copies all over America to date. On 6 July 2007, Reik participated in the Alltel Wireless "Mi Círculo, Mi Música" (My Circle, My Music) concert in El Paso, Texas.

On 8 August 2013, Reik performed at the concert of MBLAQ at the Pepsi Center in Mexico City as guest performers and on 29 October, they performed at the 2013 Seoul International Music Fair in Seoul, South Korea.

2015-present: Transition to urban music and successful singles
While finishing its sixth studio album Des/Amor the band members began to feel frustrated with the state of Latin pop music and longed for a change. Espinoza recalled, “Traditional romantic pop was in a rut...We needed to renovate ourselves.” The group enlisted reggaeton singer Nicky Jam in 2016 for a remix of "Ya Me Enteré" from Des/Amor, which became the group's first platinum-certified single. The band initially struggled with the transition from pop to urban music, with Eguía noting, “We were used to doing verse, pre-chorus, chorus, repeat, bridge, chorus. In the urban world, they're like, ‘hell no!’ For them, it's introduction, chorus, the rap part, then second chorus.” In May 2018, Reik released the single "Me niego" with Puerto Rican reggaeton singer Ozuna. "Me niego" won best Latin Pop Song of the Year at the 2019 Billboard Latin Music Awards. The song's accompanying music video was filmed in Miami and was described by Marjua Estevez of Billboard as a "heart-racing, action-packed drama".

In November 2018, the band's collaboration with Colombian singer Maluma on the single "Amigos Con Derechos" became Reik's second number one song on the Billboard Latin Pop songs chart. "Amigos Con Derechos" discusses a couple that is in love but wants to remain "friends with benefits". The group continued collaborating with urban singers, with the band enjoying the "natural disposition that urban superstars have. They help each other in collaborations, and the union they have is admirable." In May 2019, the group renewed its contract with Sony Music Mexico. Reik made its first collaboration with a K-pop group in October 2019 when it collaborated with Korean pop group Super Junior on the song “One More Time (Otra Vez)”. The single debuted at number five on the Billboard Latin Pop Digital Song Sales chart. On 9 April 2020, the group performed a live virtual concert via Youtube while in quarantine during the COVID-19 pandemic with Navarro broadcasting from New York City, Ramírez from San Diego, and Marín from Playa del Carmen, Mexico.

Discography

Studio albums

Live albums

Extended plays

Singles

As lead artist

As featuredartist

Promotional singles

Other charted and certified songs

Other appearances

Awards and nominations

Latin American Music Award
The Latin American Music Awards is an annual American music award that is presented by Telemundo to recognize outstanding achievement in the Latin music industry. Reik has received three nominations.

|-
| 2015 || Reik || Favorite Pop/Rock Duo or Group || 
|-
| 2017 || Reik || Favorite Pop/Rock Duo or Group || 
|-
| 2018 || "Me Niego" || Favorite Pop Song || 
|}

Latin Billboard Music Awards

Latin Grammy Awards
A Latin Grammy Award is an accolade by the Latin Academy of Recording Arts & Sciences to recognize outstanding achievement in the music industry. Reik has received one award from five nominations.

|-
| 2005 || Reik || Best New Artist || 
|-
| 2009 || Un Día Más || Best Pop Album by a Duo or Group with Vocals || 
|-
| 2012 || Peligro || Album of the Year || 
|-
| 2012 || "Creo en Ti" || Song of the Year || 
|-
| 2016 || Des/Amor || Best Contemporary Pop Vocal Album || 
|-
|}

LOS40 Music Awards
The Premios 40 Principales are awarded by the radio station Los 40 to recognize the best in Spanish and international music. Reik has received one award from three nominations.

|-
| 2012 || Reik || Premios 40 Principales for Best America Pop Act || 
|-
| 2018 || "Me Niego" || LOS40 Global Show Award || 
|-
| 2020 || "Enemigos"  || Best Spanish Video || 
|}

Los Premios MTV Latinoamérica
The MTV Video Music Awards Latinoamérica were awarded by Viacom International Media Networks The Americas to celebrate the top music videos of the year in Latin America and the world. Reik has received four awards from five nominations.

|-
| 2005 || Reik || Best Group or Duet || 
|-
| 2005 || Reik || Best Pop Artist || 
|-
| 2005 || Reik || Best Artist — North || 
|-
| 2005 || Reik || Best New Artist — North || 
|-
| 2009 || Reik || Best Pop Artist || 
|}

MTV Europe Music Award
The MTV Europe Music Awards are awarded by Viacom International Media Networks to honour artists and music in pop culture. Reik has received two nominations.

|-
| 2013 || Reik || Best Latin America North Act || 
|-
| 2018 || Reik || Best Latin America North Act || 
|}

MTV Millennial Awards
The MTV Millennial Awards is an annual Latin American music award presented by the cable channel MTV Latin America to honor the best of Latin music and the digital world of the millennial generation. Reik has received two nominations.

|-
| 2018 || Reik || Most Awesome Artist || 
|-
| 2018 || "Me Niego" || Collaboration of the Year || 
|}

Premios Lo Nuestro
The Premios Lo Nuestro are awarded annually by television network Univision. Reik has received 24 nominations, and one of them.

|-
| 2006 || Reik || Best New Artist || 
|-
| 2007 || Reik || Best Pop Group or Duo of the Year || 
|-
| 2008 || Reik || Best Pop Group or Duo of the Year || 
|-
| 2008 || Secuencia || Pop Album of the Year || 
|-
| 2009 || Reik || Best Pop Group or Duo of the Year || 
|-
| 2010 || Reik || Best Pop Group or Duo of the Year || 
|-
| 2012 || Reik || Best Pop Group or Duo of the Year || 
|-
| 2012 || Peligro || Pop Album of the Year || 
|-
| 2012 || "Peligro" || Pop Song of the Year || 
|-
| 2013 || Reik || Best Pop Group or Duo of the Year || 
|-
| 2014 || Reik || Best Pop Group or Duo of the Year || 
|-
| 2017 || Reik || Best Pop Group or Duo of the Year || 
|-
| 2017 || Des/Amor || Pop Album of the Year || 
|-
| 2017 || "Ya Me Enteré" || Pop Song of the Year || 
|-
| rowspan="10" align="center" | 2020 
| rowspan="2" | "Themselves" 
| Artist of the Year 
| 
|-
| Pop/Rock Group or Duo of the Year
| 
|-
| Ahora
| Album of the Year
| 
|-
| rowspan="4" | Un Año
| Song of the Year
| 
|-
| Single of the Year
| 
|-
| Pop/Rock Song of the Year
| 
|-
| Pop/Rock Collaboration of the Year
| 
|-
| "Aleluya" – Reik and Manuel Turizo
| Video of the Year
| 
|-
| rowspan="2" | Amigos Con Derechos
| Pop/Rock Collaboration of the Year
| 
|-
| Urban/Pop Song of the Year
| 
|}

Premios Juventud
The Premios Juventud are awarded annually by television network Univision. Reik has received one nomination.

|-
| 2017 || "Qué Gano Olvidándote" || Best Song For Singing || 
|}

Premios Tu Mundo
The Premios Tu Mundo are awarded annually by television network Telemundo. Reik has received three nominations.

|-
| 2014 || Reik || Favorite Duo or Group || 
|-
| 2016 || Reik || Favorite Pop Artist || 
|-
| 2017 || Reik || Favorite Pop Artist by iHeartRadio || 
|}

References

External links
  Official site
  Official Myspace
  Music videos from Reik

Musical groups from Mexicali
Mexican pop music groups
Latin Grammy Award winners
Sony Music Latin artists
Latin pop music groups